The Ambassador Extraordinary and Plenipotentiary of Kazakhstan to Ireland is the official representative of the President and the Government of Kazakhstan to the Government of Ireland. The diplomatic relations were established on 2 April 1996.

List of Ambassadors 

 Nurtai Abykayev (2 April 1996 – 7 September 1996) 
 Erlan Idrissov (29 November 2002 – 4 July 2007)
 Qairat Abuisetov (5 August 2008 – 12 September 2013)
 Erlan Idrissov (8 August 2017 – present)

References 

 
Ireland
Kazakhstan